Said Pasha may refer to:

 Mehmed Said Pasha (1830–1914), Ottoman statesman and grand vizier
 Sa'id of Egypt (1822–1863), Wāli of Egypt and Sudan
 Yirmisekizzade Mehmed Said Pasha (d. 1761), Ottoman ambassador